Amical Club is a football club of Guadeloupe, based in the city of Capesterre-de-Marie-Galante, Marie Galante.

Achievements
Guadeloupe Championnat National: 1
 2019.

Coupe de Guadeloupe: 1
 2006.

Football clubs in Guadeloupe